Isando is a town in Ekurhuleni in the Gauteng province of South Africa. It is also the name of the medical cannabis flower produced by MedCan.

History
Industrial township south-west of Kempton Park, 22 km east of Johannesburg. It was laid out on the farm Witkoppie and proclaimed on 21 December 1949. The name is of Bantu origin and it is the Zulu name for a hammer.

References

Kempton Park, Gauteng
Populated places in Ekurhuleni
Industrial parks